Fauna of Serbia may refer to:

 List of birds of Serbia
 List of mammals of Serbia

See also
 Outline of Serbia